The following is a list of churches in Torbay, Devon, England.

Active churches
The unitary authority has an estimated 65 active churches for 130,959 people, a ratio of one church for every 2,015 inhabitants. Before the eighteenth century there were only five medieval parish churches in the area.

Defunct churches

References

External links
The Official online Guide to the English Riviera

Torbay
Torbay
 
Churches
Churches